"Out of This World" is an American popular song composed by Harold Arlen, with lyrics written by Johnny Mercer. It was first recorded by Jo Stafford with Paul Weston and his Orchestra in 1944.

It was introduced in the film Out of This World (1945) by Bing Crosby dubbing in for the voice of the main character played by Eddie Bracken.

Alec Wilder describes the Arlen melody as creating a modal feeling (E-flat Dorian) that achieves an unearthly effect. It is unlike his other lyric ballads in that it is one of Arlen's most direct and deliberately unrhythmic melodies—altogether a strong song with splendid support from the Johnny Mercer lyric.

Notable recordings
Jo Stafford with Paul Weston and his Orchestra - recorded September 1944, released 1945 and reached he Billboard charts with a peak position of No. 9. 
Bing Crosby - recorded December 4, 1944 with John Scott Trotter and His Orchestra. 
Tommy Dorsey and His Orchestra (vocal by Stuart Foster). This charted briefly in 1945.
Woody Herman and His Orchestra - Out Of This World b/w Apple Honey Frances Wayne on vocals (1945)
Chris Connor - Sings Lullabys For Lovers (1954)
Kay Winding and J.J. Johnson - Lasy Winding and J.J. JiohnsomEast Coast Jazz 7 (1955 album)
Art Farmer - Last Night When We Were Young (album) (1957)
Lee Konitz - You and Lee (1958)
Walter Benton - Out of This World (1960 album)
June Christy - Off-Beat (1960)
Gerry Mulligan - The Concert Jazz Band (1960)
Creed Taylor - Panic: The Son of Shock (1960). Instrumental arrangement used as theme music for Strange Tales of Science Fiction movie presentations, Channel 9 KHJ, greater Los Angeles, 1960s-1970s
Pepper Adams Donald Byrd Quintet - Out of this World (1961 album)
Ella Fitzgerald - Ella Fitzgerald Sings the Harold Arlen Songbook (1961)
Les McCann - Les McCann Ltd. Plays the Shampoo  (1961) 
Mark Murphy - Rah! (1961)
John Coltrane - Coltrane (1962)
Cal Tjader (arr. Clare Fischer) - Cal Tjader Plays Harold Arlen (recorded 1960, released 1962)
The Three Sounds - Out of This World (1962 album)
Sammy Davis Jr. - for his album As Long as She Needs Me (1963)
Tony Bennett - For Once in My Life (1967)
Rosemary Clooney - Sings the Music of Harold Arlen (1983)
Mel Tormé - A Vintage Year (1987)
Julie Andrews - Love, Julie (1987)
Norma Winstone - Somewhere Called Home (1987)
Tina May – Fun (1993)
Nancy LaMott - Listen to My Heart (1995 album)
Maureen McGovern - Out of This World (1996 album)
Brian Lane Green - Over the Rainbow: The Music of Harold Arlen (recorded live 1995), Brian Lane Green (1997 album)
Rosemary Clooney - Out of This World (2000)
Roz Corral -Telling Tales (2005)
Rachael MacFarlane - Hayley Sings (2012)
Jane Ira Bloom - Sixteen Sunsets (2013)
Jamie Cullum - Interlude (2014)
Stevie Holland - on her 2015 album Life Goes On''.
Frank Comstock - Project: Comstock - Music from Outer Space (1962 album)

References

External links
http://www.secondhandsongs.com/performance/11821

1944 songs
Jo Stafford songs
Bing Crosby songs
Songs with music by Harold Arlen
Songs with lyrics by Johnny Mercer
Songs written for films